Jessica Lynn Danilczyk (known professionally as Jessie Daniels) (born August 2, 1987) is an American former actress, singer, and songwriter. She has appeared in independent films and commercials for Lifetime Television and MTV. She has also appeared in musical theater and off-Broadway plays. She retired from the entertainment industry in 2008.

Discography and appearances 
In 2003, Daniels recorded an EP which she released independently via her website. She was also part of the World News Tonight 9/11 tribute special.
Daniels's debut and only studio album Jessie Daniels was released on June 6, 2006. She co-wrote the entire album with her producer Scotty D. Three singles from the album appeared on music charts:
The Noise, Everyday & What I Hear.

Musical style and influences 
Her musical style was described as a mix of pop rock, power pop and pop punk with Christian based lyrics. Her musical influences included Michelle Branch, Avril Lavigne, Stacie Orrico, Evanescence and Kelly Clarkson.

References 

1987 births
Living people
American performers of Christian music
Midas Records Nashville artists
21st-century American women singers
21st-century American singers